Nova Religio: The Journal of Alternative and Emergent Religions is a quarterly peer-reviewed academic journal covering religious studies, focusing on the academic study of new religious movements. It was established in 1997 by Seven Bridges Press, initially published semi-annually, changing to tri-annually in 2003, and then quarterly in 2005. In 2002 (volume 6), it became published by the University of California Press.

Abstracting and indexing
The journal is abstracted and indexed in:

References

External links
 

Religious studies journals
University of California Press academic journals
Publications established in 1997
Quarterly journals
New religious movements